Nahra is a village in Batala in Gurdaspur district of Punjab State, India. Nahra may also refer to:

Azhar Qayyum Nahra (born 1977), member of the National Assembly of Pakistan
Joseph J. Nahra (1927–2022), American lawyer and judge from Ohio
Rafic Nahra (born 1959), Lebanese priest of the Catholic Church